Peel is an unincorporated community in Marion County, Arkansas, United States. Peel has a post office with ZIP code 72668.

References

Unincorporated communities in Marion County, Arkansas
Unincorporated communities in Arkansas